Crasville-la-Rocquefort is a commune in the Seine-Maritime department in the Normandy region in northern France.

Geography

Population

Places of interest
 The church of St.Martin, dating from the sixteenth century.
 The chateau, built on the foundations of a feudal castle.

See also
Communes of the Seine-Maritime department

References

Communes of Seine-Maritime